Shaarei Shomayim Congregation, located in North York, Toronto, Ontario, Canada, is a Modern Orthodox synagogue, located within the community eruv. The synagogue membership is approximately 700 family members. The current Senior Rabbi is Sam Taylor. The Rabbi is Elliot Diamond. The Assistant Rabbi is Sammy Bergman.

History 

The congregation was first established in 1928 at 563 Christie Street. Its original name was the Hillcrest Congregation. The congregation moved to 840 St. Clair Avenue West in 1937, beginning, as many congregations both Jewish and Christian have done, by constructing a basement space, today the social hall, but first used as a worship space. The building was finally completed in 1947.

The congregation moved to its present building, 470 Glencairn Avenue, in 1966. Around 2005, the mechitza in the building's sanctuary was raised; the wood-and-glass mechitza now rises 48 inches above the women's section. Around 2010, part of the building was renovated. The board of directors plans to renovate the rest of the building once it raises the required funds.

Clergy 
Senior Rabbi: Rabbi Sam Taylor
Rabbi: Rabbi Elliot Diamond
Assistant Rabbi: Rabbi Sammy Bergman
Chazan: Rabbi Chaim Freund
Shamash and Baal Kriyah: Ralph Levine

References

External links 
 
 Clergy Page

Jewish Canadian history
Synagogues in Toronto
Modern Orthodox synagogues in Canada